Vientiane railway station is a railway station in Vientiane, Laos. It is the second station on the Boten–Vientiane railway. The largest and most important station on the line, the station was opened along with the rest of the line on 3 December 2021.

Design

The station's theme is the City of Sandalwood, reflecting the original meaning of "Vientiane".  The building is based on traditional Chinese architecture combined with Laotian environmental characteristics.  The facade features eight tree-branch-shaped eaves, meant to evoke a tropical rainforest.

Services
As of October 2022, the station has three services per day: two via Luang Prabang to Boten at the Chinese border, and one to Luang Prabang only. Due to the COVID-19 pandemic in mainland China, there are no cross-border passenger services yet.

Future expansion
All tracks at the station are standard gauge, so the station does not serve the existing narrow-gauge railway from Thailand to Laos, which terminates at Thanaleng railway station, some 15 km to the south.  The standard gauge Bangkok–Nong Khai high-speed railway, scheduled for completion in 2028, may eventually extend to Vientiane station, completing the Kunming–Singapore railway.

In 2022, the Vientiane Times announced that Laos intends to build a new standard-gauge railway from Vientiane to the port of Vung Ang in central Vietnam.

References 

Railway stations in Laos
Railway stations opened in 2021